Newbridge-on-Usk (Welsh: Pontnewydd ar Wysg) is a hamlet in the village and parish of Tredunnock, near Usk, Monmouthshire, south east Wales, in the United Kingdom.

Location

Newbridge-on-Usk is located on the River Usk  to the north of Newport in the Vale of Usk.

History and amenities
At the river is the Newbridge Inn, once owned by radio and television presenter Chris Evans. The inn is owned and run by the Celtic Manor Resort. It offers bed and breakfast facilities in six newly built, en-suite rooms and has an AA-award-winning restaurant.

The elegant red sandstone three-arched New Bridge dates from 1779 and is said to have been designed by William Edwards. It is Grade II* listed. It stands at the Normal Tidal Limit (NTL) of the River Usk.

References

External links
 
 www.geograph.co.uk : photos of Newbridge-on-Usk and surrounding area

Villages in Monmouthshire
River Usk